Danger Crue Records is a Japanese visual kei independent record label located in Tokyo, Japan. It was originally the record label of the Danger Crue music office, both founded in 1981. According to D'erlanger drummer Tetsu, Danger Crue was formed for the heavy metal band 44Magnum. The first release by Danger Crue was the album Insane by Reaction in July 1985. In April 2000, the office changed its name to the Maverick D.C. Group but continues to run the Danger Crue Records label.

In 2002, Maverick D.C. held a concert to celebrate the 20th anniversary of Danger Crue. It has since become an annual year-end event under the name Jack in the Box since 2007; derived from the nickname of Maverick D.C. president Masahiro Oishi. On December 27, 2021, Jack in the Box celebrated Danger Crue's 40th anniversary at the Nippon Budokan.

Artists

 44Magnum
 Acid android
 Alsdead
 Blaze
 Bug
 CLØWD
 Creature Creature
 D.I.D.
 DIV
 D'erlanger (1989)
 Dead End
 Der Zibet
 Die in Cries
 Earthshaker
 Girugamesh
 Grand Slam
 Heaven's

 Kameleo
 Ken
 L'Arc-en-Ciel (1992-1993)
 Lions Heads
 Mucc, on their own sub-label Shu (2002, 2009–2010, 2017–present)
 Naniwa Exp
 Optic Nerve
 Petit Brabancon
 Ra:IN
 Reaction
 Roach
 Sid (2003–2008)
 Solid
 Sons of All Pussys
 UNiTE.
 Velvet Spider
 Zoro

References

External links
 Official website
 Jack in the Box official website

Japanese independent record labels
Rock record labels